Pink Panther and Sons is an American animated television series produced by Hanna-Barbera Productions and Mirisch-Geoffrey-DePatie-Freleng. The series was originally broadcast on NBC from 1984 to 1985 and moved to ABC in 1986. Friz Freleng (a close friend of Joseph Barbera and William Hanna since all three worked on MGM cartoons in the 1930s) served as creative producer for the series as his and David H. DePatie's production company, DePatie–Freleng Enterprises, existed as an in-name-only enterprise by this time, as its operations were absorbed by Marvel Productions in 1981. The show is based on the Pink Panther, a character created in 1963.

Plot 
The series centers on The Pink Panther's two sons: pre-teen Pinky, his brother, toddler Panky and their friends in the Rainbow Panthers crew (the pretty Chatta, fighting Rocko, gibberish-talking Murfel, overalls-wearing Annie, and mixed-up-talking Punkin). Each episode shows the Rainbow Panthers coming together in friendship as they learn about growing up and take on a group of lions called the Howl Angels.

Featured in each episode would be short three to five minutes cartoons featuring The Pink Panther bookending the main cartoons with Pinky and Panky.

Characters

Rainbow Panthers 
 Pinky (voiced by Billy Bowles) - Pinky is a very polite young panther. Pinky generally ends up getting in the most danger in situations, such as turning six inches tall in one episode, and is the one who comes up with most of the ideas. He is the leader of the Rainbow Panthers and he is in love with Chatta, a purple panther in the group.
 Panky (voiced by B.J. Ward) – Panky is Pinky's little brother. His diaper is never tied correctly so he just holds it up wherever he goes. Since he is still a toddler, he is considered very impressionable, and tends to wander from his older brother.
 Chatta (voiced by Sherry Lynn) – Chatta is a purple panther. She is in love with Pinky and often tries to impress him to win his affection. She also has an enormous vocabulary.
 Murfel (voiced by Shane McCob) – Murfel is a green panther who wears an oversized knit cap. Murfel always mumbles or slurs when he speaks, and as a result, it is difficult (albeit possible) for the audience to decipher what he is saying, although the other members of the Rainbow Panthers seem to understand him without much hassle.
 Rocko (voiced by Frank Welker) – Rocko is a yellow panther who is the most athletic of the group. Eager and energetic, he is always seen sporting boxing gloves and shorts.
 Annie O'Gizmo (voiced by Jeannie Elias) – Annie is an orange panther sporting overalls and a hard hat. She is very scientific and is considered the intellectual of the group.
 Punkin (voiced by B.J. Ward) – Punkin is a blue panther who wears a baseball cap and a wool sweater. He tends to confuse words and often requires multiple attempts to say what he means.
 The Pink Panther – Celebrity star of film and television, and the father of Pinky and Panky.

Howl Angels 
 Finko (voiced by Frank Welker) – Finko is the leader of the Howl Angels. An orange-colored lion with a multicolored mohawk, Finko is a rival to Pinky and one time was babysitter to Panky at the time when Pinky and Chatta go on a date to the movies.
 Howl (voiced by Marshall Efron) – Howl is a diminutive lion and the scheming right-hand man to Finko. He wears a saucepan on his head as a helmet.
 Liona (voiced by Jeannie Elias) – Liona is a lioness, she is tough but pretty, she has a crush on Rainbow Panthers club leader Pinky. She and Chatta fight for his affection.
 Bowlhead (voiced by Gregg Berger) and Buckethead (voiced by Sonny Melendrez) – Bowlhead and Buckethead are two of Finko's goons and are often paired together when partaking in the Howl Angels' schemes, usually serving as comic relief. Fitting to their names, Bowlhead wears on his head a bowl adorned with horns, while Buckethead wears an iron bucket.

Voice cast 
 Gregg Berger as Bowlhead
 Billy Bowles as Pinky
 Marshall Efron as Howl
 Jeannie Elias as Annie O'Gizmo, Liona
 Sherry Lynn as Chatta
 Shane McCob as Murfel
 Sonny Melendrez as Buckethead
 B.J. Ward as Panky, Punkin
 Frank Welker as Rocko, Finko, Prehistoric Cat, Truck Driver

Additional voices 
 Bob Arbogast
 Hamilton Camp
 Rick Cimino
 Peter Cullen
 Rick Dees
 Barry Dennen
 Paul Eiding
 Paul Ely
 Phillip Hartman
 Erv Immerman
 Ralph James
 Tommy Lasorda as Himself (in "Pinky at the Bat")
 Allan Lurie
 Don Messick as Film Festival Announcer and Alien
 Cliff Norton
 Roger Rose
 Neil Ross
 Michael Rye
 William Schallert
 Andre Stojka as Mr. Right
 Michael Villani
 William Windom

Episodes

Other media 
A children's book called Pink Panther: Fun at the Picnic was based on the series. Unlike the cartoon series, the Pink Panther is shown speaking. The story was where the Pink Panther had been hired as a magician for a party and asked Pinky to assist him, upsetting Panky who felt left out. The Pink Panther decides to start his act creating "two Pink Panthers!" displaying Pinky and Panky onstage.

References

External links 
 

1980s American animated television series
1984 American television series debuts
1986 American television series endings
American children's animated comedy television series
American sequel television series
American Broadcasting Company original programming
Animated television series about brothers
Animated television series about children
Animated television series about mammals
English-language television shows
NBC original programming
Television series by Hanna-Barbera
Television series by MGM Television
The Pink Panther (cartoons) television series